Inspiration is a 1931 American pre-Code Metro-Goldwyn-Mayer romantic melodrama film adapted by Gene Markey from the Alphonse Daudet short novel Sappho (1884). The film stars Greta Garbo, Robert Montgomery, Lewis Stone and Marjorie Rambeau. It was directed by Clarence Brown and produced by Irving Thalberg. The cinematography was performed by William H. Daniels, the art direction by Cedric Gibbons and the costume design by Adrian.

Plot

Yvonne Valbret is a Parisian kept woman who poses as an artist's model. She falls in love with a young student of foreign diplomacy, André Montell. When André learns of her past and her multiple lovers, he leaves her. But finding Yvonne living in poverty when their paths cross again, he pays for her to live in his country cottage outside Paris and they engage in a platonic relationship. He soon reveals his intent to marry another woman as Yvonne begs him not to desert her. André eventually realizes that he loves Yvonne and decides to choose love over career. When he comes to the cottage to tell her, he is met by one of Yvonne's old lovers pleading with her to return to him. She immediately decides to marry André, but fearing that their relationship will ruin his career, she chooses her old lover and writes André a farewell note while he is sleeping.

Cast
Greta Garbo as Yvonne Valbret
Robert Montgomery as Andre Montell
Lewis Stone as Raymond Delval
Marjorie Rambeau as Lulu
Judith Vosselli as Odette
Beryl Mercer as Marthe, Yvonne's maid
John Miljan as Henry Coutant, the sculptor
Edwin Maxwell as Uncle Julian Montell
Oscar Apfel as M. Vignaud
Joan Marsh as Madeleine Dorety
Zelda Sears as Aunt Pauline
Karen Morley as Liane Latour
Gwen Lee as Gaby
Paul McAllister as Jouvet
Arthur Hoyt as Gavarni
Richard Tucker as Galand

Reception 
The film earned approximately $1,127,000 in its worldwide distribution, resulting in a $286,000 profit for MGM.

References

Further reading
 Mark A. Vieira. Greta Garbo: A Cinematic Legacy. New York: Harry N. Abrams, 2005;

External links

 
 
 Film information at Garbo Forever

1931 films
American drama films
1931 drama films
American black-and-white films
Films based on French novels
Films based on works by Alphonse Daudet
Films directed by Clarence Brown
Metro-Goldwyn-Mayer films
Films produced by Irving Thalberg
1930s English-language films
1930s American films